Beduschi is an Italian surname. Notable people with the surname include:

Andrea Beduschi (born 1992), Italian footballer
Antonio Beduschi (born 1576– alive 1607), Italian painter of the early-Baroque period
Carina Beduschi (born 1984), Brazilian model and beauty pageant winner
Cavour Beduschi (1860–1936), Italian engineer and politician
Giuseppe Beduschi (1874–1924), Italian missionary
Paolo Beduschi (1894–1992), Italian World War I fighter pilot

Italian-language surnames